A biovar is a variant prokaryotic strain that differs physiologically or biochemically from other strains in a particular species. Morphovars (or morphotypes) are those strains that differ morphologically. Serovars (or serotypes) are those strains that have antigenic properties that differ from other strains.


List of biovars
This is a list of biovars and strains of biovars listed at the NCBI Taxonomy database:
Acinetobacter calcoaceticus biovar anitratus, a homotypic synonym for Acinetobacter calcoaceticus subsp. anitratus
Actinobacillus anseriformium biovar 1
Actinobacillus anseriformium biovar 2
Aeromonas veronii bv. sobria
Aeromonas veronii bv. veronii
Agrobacterium biovar 1, a synonym for Agrobacterium tumefaciens complex
Agrobacterium biovar 2, a synonym for Agrobacterium rhizogenes
Agrobacterium biovar 3, a synonym for Agrobacterium vitis
Bacillus cereus biovar anthracis
Bacillus cereus biovar anthracis str. CI
Bacillus thuringiensis biovar tenebrionis, a synonym for Bacillus thuringiensis serovar tenebrionis
Bacillus cereus biovar toyoi, a synonym for Bacillus toyonensis
Bacillus wiedmannii bv. thuringiensis
Pasteurella haemolytica biovar T, synonym of Bibersteinia trehalosi
Bifidobacterium longum bv. Suis, homotypic synonym of Bifidobacterium longum subsp. suis
Bisgaard taxon 3 biovar 1
Bradyrhizobium retamae bv. lupini
Bradyrhizobium valentinum bv. lupini
Brucella melitensis biovar Abortus, a synonym for Brucella abortus
Brucella melitensis biovar Abortus 2308, a synonym for Brucella abortus 2308
Brucella abortus bv. 1
Brucella abortus bv. 1 str. 9-941
Brucella abortus bv. 2
Brucella abortus bv. 3
Brucella abortus bv. 4
Brucella melitensis biovar Canis, a synonym for Brucella canis
Brucella melitensis biovar Melitensis
Brucella melitensis bv. 1
Brucella melitensis bv. 2
Brucella melitensis bv. 3
Brucella melitensis biovar Neotomae, synonym for Brucella neotomae
Brucella melitensis biovar Ovis, synonym for Brucella ovis
Brucella melitensis biovar Suis, synonym for Brucella suis
Brucella melitensis biovar Suis str. 1330, synonym for Brucella suis 1330
Brucella suis bv. 1
Brucella suis bv. 2
Campylobacter sputorum biovar faecalis
Campylobacter sputorum biovar paraureolyticus
Campylobacter sputorum biovar sputorum
Candidatus Streptomyces philanthi bv. albopilosus
Candidatus Streptomyces philanthi bv. barbiger
Candidatus Streptomyces philanthi bv. basilaris
Candidatus Streptomyces philanthi bv. bicinctus
Candidatus Streptomyces philanthi bv. bilunatus
Candidatus Streptomyces philanthi bv. capensis
Candidatus Streptomyces philanthi bv. coarctatus
Candidatus Streptomyces philanthi bv. crabroniformis
Candidatus Streptomyces philanthi bv. crotoniphilus
Candidatus Streptomyces philanthi bv. elongatus
Candidatus Streptomyces philanthi bv. fuscipennis
Candidatus Streptomyces philanthi bv. gibbosus
Candidatus Streptomyces philanthi bv. gloriosus
Candidatus Streptomyces philanthi bv. histrio
Candidatus Streptomyces philanthi bv. inversus
Candidatus Streptomyces philanthi bv. lepidus
Candidatus Streptomyces philanthi bv. loefflingi
Candidatus Streptomyces philanthi bv. multimaculatus
Candidatus Streptomyces philanthi bv. pacificus
Candidatus Streptomyces philanthi bv. parkeri
Candidatus Streptomyces philanthi bv. politus
Candidatus Streptomyces philanthi bv. psyche
Candidatus Streptomyces philanthi bv. pulcher
Candidatus Streptomyces philanthi bv. quattuordecimpunctatus
Candidatus Streptomyces philanthi bv. rugosus
Candidatus Streptomyces philanthi bv. tarsatus
Candidatus Streptomyces philanthi bv. triangulum
Candidatus Streptomyces philanthi bv. triangulum diadema
Candidatus Streptomyces philanthi bv. ventilabris
Candidatus Streptomyces philanthi bv. venustus
Candidatus Streptomyces philanthi bv. zebratus
Citrobacter sp. biovar 4280, synonym for Citrobacter rodentium
Corynebacterium diphtheriae bv. belfanti, synonym for Corynebacterium belfantii
Corynebacterium diphtheriae bv. intermedius
Corynebacterium diphtheriae bv. mitis
Corynebacterium ulcerans bv. belfanti
Francisella tularensis Biovar A str. SCHU S4, synonym for Francisella tularensis subsp. tularensis SCHU S4
Fusobacterium necrophorum biovar A, synonym for Fusobacterium necrophorum subsp. necrophorum
Fusobacterium necrophorum biovar B, synonym for Fusobacterium necrophorum subsp. funduliforme
Fusobacterium necrophorum biovar C, synonym for Fusobacterium varium
Gallibacterium anatis biovar haemolytica
Haemophilus influenzae biovar IV, synonym for Haemophilus quentini
Lactobacillus helveticus biovar jugurti, synonym for Lactobacillus helveticus subsp. jugurti
Lactococcus lactis subsp. lactis bv. diacetylactis
Marinilabilia salmonicolor biovar Agarovorans
Mesorhizobium ciceri biovar biserrulae
Mesorhizobium ciceri biovar biserrulae WSM1271
Protomonas extorquens (biovar 2), synonym for Methylorubrum rhodinum
Protomonas extorquens (biovar 3), synonym for Methylobacterium radiotolerans
Mycobacterium fortuitum biovar peregrinum, synonym for Mycolicibacterium peregrinum
Neorhizobium galegae bv. officinalis
Neorhizobium galegae bv. orientalis
Phyllobacterium sophorae bv. mediterranense
Bacteroides (Prevotella) ruminicola subsp. ruminicola biovar 7, synonym for Prevotella albensis
Bacteroides (Prevotella) ruminicola subsp. ruminicola biovar 3, synonym for Prevotella bryantii
Prochlorococcus marinus bv. HNLC1
Prochlorococcus marinus bv. HNLC2
Pseudomonas fluorescens biovar B
Ralstonia pickettii biovar 3/'thomasii', synonym for Ralstonia mannitolilytica
Rhizobium leguminosarum bv. phaseoli
Rhizobium leguminosarum bv. trifolii
Rhizobium leguminosarum bv. viciae also known as Rhizobium leguminosarum symbiovar viciae
Rhizobium sp. (biovar cowpea), synonym for Rhizobium sp. IRc78
Pasteurella pneumotropica biovar Heyl, synonym for Rodentibacter heylii
Sinorhizobium meliloti bv. medicaginis
Streptococcus mitis bv. 2
Ureaplasma urealyticum biovar 1, synonym for Ureaplasma parvum
Ureaplasma urealyticum biovar 2, synonym for Ureaplasma urealyticum
Vibrio cholerae biovar albensis VL426, synonym for Vibrio albensis VL426
Vibrio cholerae biovar albensis, synonym for Vibrio cholerae
Vibrio cholerae O1 biovar El Tor
Vibrio cholerae O1 biovar El Tor str. Inaba RND18826
Vibrio cholerae O1 biovar El Tor str. Inaba RND18899
Vibrio cholerae O1 biovar El Tor str. L-3226
Vibrio cholerae O1 biovar El Tor str. N16961
Vibrio cholerae O1 biovar El Tor str. Ogawa RND19187
Vibrio cholerae O1 biovar El Tor str. Ogawa RND6878
Yersinia pestis biovar Antiqua
Yersinia pestis biovar Antiqua str. B42003004
Yersinia pestis biovar Antiqua str. E1979001
Yersinia pestis biovar Antiqua str. UG05-0454
Yersinia pestis biovar Mediaevalis
Yersinia pestis biovar Mediaevalis str. K1973002
Yersinia pestis biovar Mediaevalis str. Harbin 35
Yersinia pestis biovar Microtus
Yersinia pestis biovar Microtus str. 91001
Yersinia pestis biovar Orientalis
Yersinia pestis biovar Orientalis str. AS200901156
Yersinia pestis biovar Orientalis str. AS200901434
Yersinia pestis biovar Orientalis str. AS200901509
Yersinia pestis biovar Orientalis str. AS200901539
Yersinia pestis biovar Orientalis str. AS200902147
Yersinia pestis biovar Orientalis str. BA200901703
Yersinia pestis biovar Orientalis str. BA200901799
Yersinia pestis biovar Orientalis str. BA200901990
Yersinia pestis biovar Orientalis str. BA200902009
Yersinia pestis biovar Orientalis str. F1991016
Yersinia pestis biovar Orientalis str. IP275
Yersinia pestis biovar Orientalis str. IP674
Yersinia pestis biovar Orientalis str. India 195
Yersinia pestis biovar Orientalis str. MG05-1020
Yersinia pestis biovar Orientalis str. PEXU2
Yersinia pestis subsp. microtus bv. Altaica
Yersinia pestis subsp. microtus bv. Caucasica
Yersinia pestis subsp. microtus bv. Hissarica
Yersinia pestis subsp. microtus bv. Ulegeica

See also
Chemovar
Pathovar

References

Microbiology terms
Prokaryote taxonomy
Taxa by rank
Biovars